Hermann Stiegholzer (July 12, 1894 – October 21, 1982) was an Austrian architect. In 1936 he won a bronze medal together with Herbert Kastinger in the art competitions of the Olympic Games for his "Kampfstätte in Wien" ("Sporting Centre in Vienna").

References

External links
 profile

1894 births
1982 deaths
Austrian architects
Olympic bronze medalists in art competitions
Medalists at the 1936 Summer Olympics
Olympic competitors in art competitions